Marko Božić (born 14 May 1998) is an Austrian footballer who plays as a midfielder for Slovenian club Maribor, on loan from Italian club Frosinone.

Career
On 31 January 2022, Božić signed a two-and-a-half year contract with Italian Serie B club Frosinone. He made his Serie B debut for Frosinone on 15 March 2022 in a game against Crotone.

On 14 June 2022, he joined Maribor on a one-year loan deal with an option to buy.

References

External links
 

1998 births
Living people
Austrian footballers
Association football midfielders
SK Rapid Wien players
NK Radomlje players
Frosinone Calcio players
NK Maribor players
Austrian Regionalliga players
2. Liga (Austria) players
Slovenian PrvaLiga players
Serie B players
Austrian expatriate footballers
Austrian expatriate sportspeople in Slovenia
Expatriate footballers in Slovenia
Austrian expatriate sportspeople in Italy
Expatriate footballers in Italy